Samuel H. Scott was a lawyer and state legislator in Arkansas. He served in the Arkansas House of Representatives in 1885 representing Jefferson County, Arkansas. In 1885 he represented the county along with Ed Glover (politician) and William B. Jacko in the state house. The caption of a composite photograph of 1885 representatives in Arkansas lists him as a Republican, Methodist, lawyer, who lived in Pine Bluff and was born in New York. It states he had lived in Arkansas for 5 years.

See also
African-American officeholders during and following the Reconstruction era

References

Republican Party members of the Arkansas House of Representatives
19th-century American politicians
People from Jefferson County, Arkansas
19th-century American lawyers
Year of birth missing